Alvinehkar (also Romanized as Alvīnehkar; also known as Alvīnehgar) is a village in Zamkan Rural District, in the Central District of Salas-e Babajani County, Kermanshah Province, Iran. At the 2006 census, its population was 90, in 16 families.

References 

Populated places in Salas-e Babajani County